Deraz Darreh (also Romanized as Derāz Darreh) is a village in Dehdez Rural District, Dehdez District, Izeh County, Khuzestan Province, Iran. At the 2006 census, its population was 354, in 54 families.

References 

Populated places in Izeh County